Jewelry Day is the 5th single released from the Japanese singer Ayaka.

Information
Jewelry Day was released on July 4, 2007. The title track was used as the ending theme to a Japanese movie entitled Last Love. Ayaka performed the song, among many others, at Live Earth Japan on July 7, 2007. On its first day on the Oricon daily singles chart, the single reached the 4th position and would later climb to the 2nd position the next day. In its first week, the single claimed the 2nd spot on the top ten weekly singles.

Track listing

Charts

References

2007 singles
Ayaka songs
2007 songs
Japanese film songs
Songs written by Ayaka